The Attucks School, also known as Southeast Elementary School or Attucks Alternative Academy, is a site in Vinita, Oklahoma, significant in black heritage.

The building was listed on the U.S. National Register of Historic Places on December 3, 2009. The listing was announced as the featured listing in the National Park Service's weekly list of December 11, 2009.

References

External links

School buildings on the National Register of Historic Places in Oklahoma
Buildings and structures in Craig County, Oklahoma
Art Deco architecture in Oklahoma
African-American history of Oklahoma
Works Progress Administration in Oklahoma
National Register of Historic Places in Craig County, Oklahoma
School buildings completed in 1917
1917 establishments in Oklahoma